Cedric the Entertainer Presents is an American sketch comedy television series and television program featuring dance numbers starring Cedric the Entertainer. The series premiered September 18, 2002 on Fox and after the first season, Fox renewed the show for a second season but canceled it just as the season was about to air.

Cast
Cedric the Entertainer
Wendy Raquel Robinson
Harold King
Shaun Majumder
Amy Brassette
J.B. Smoove
Kyle Dunnigan
Lisa Joann Thompson

Recurring sketches
 Cafeteria Lady
 Cooking with Chef Reverend
 Jingle Fever
 Love Doctor
 Player Babies
 Que Hora Es ("The Mexican soap opera for people who only had 3 weeks of Spanish in the 4th grade")
 Thug Pranks
 President Cedric
 The Horny Bears
 Raj
 Tap Dawgs
 Cicely & Cash
 Mama
 Dual Conscience
 Bathroom Guy
 Channel 6 News
 Schleppy & Fry Pan

Awards

Award nominations
Art Directors Guild
Television - Variety or Awards Show, Music Special or Documentary (2003)
Emmy Awards
Outstanding Art Direction for a Variety or Music Program (2003)
Image Awards
Outstanding Actor in a Comedy Series, Cedric the Entertainer (2003)
Outstanding Supporting Actress in a Comedy Series, Wendy Raquel Robinson (2003)
Outstanding Variety - Series or Special (2003)
Teen Choice Awards
Choice TV Breakout Star - Male, Cedric the Entertainer (2003)

References

2000s American sketch comedy television series
2002 American television series debuts
2003 American television series endings
Fox Broadcasting Company original programming
Television series by 20th Century Fox Television